Kayla Lynne Sharples (born June 17, 1997) is an American professional soccer player who plays as a defender for Chicago Red Stars of the National Women's Soccer League (NWSL).

Club career

Chicago Red Stars

Loan to Adelaide United
In December 2021, Sharples was loaned to Australian club Adelaide United, just before the beginning of the 2021–22 A-League Women season.

References

External links
 

1997 births
Living people
American women's soccer players
Chicago Red Stars players
Adelaide United FC (A-League Women) players
National Women's Soccer League players
Chicago Red Stars draft picks
Northwestern Wildcats women's soccer players
Sportspeople from Naperville, Illinois
Soccer players from Illinois
Women's association football defenders